Mini hockey or Minkey is a modified form of field hockey designed for primary school children.    

The Minkey is derived from "MINi hocKEY", and originated in Australia more than 20 years ago. It is currently offered in under-7 and under-9 variants throughout Australia, on more-or-less half-sized fields, and with simplified rules. A similar game is popular in Canada where it is generally referred to as "mini hockey." The Canadian version is usually unstructured and played by children with "mini hockey sticks" approximately 20 inches in length inside homes and schools, although some more structured leagues do exist.

Field

The Mini hockey field is a cut down and simplified version of the full hockey field.

The dimensions of the field are as follows:

Note: The Mini hockey field sizes are approximate, and can be adjusted to suit the available space and size of players.

Rules

Each field has at least one marker at each corner, on the centre line at each side, and 10 metres from each back line on each side. The goals consist of a marker on each side, or some mechanism at least half a metre deep to catch the ball .

Mini hockey teams are made up of 6 players ( in the under-7s game ) or 7 players (in the under-9s game), of both sexes.

Games consist of two 15-minute periods. To start the game, a face off is taken on the centre line. Each team is required to be in their own half prior to the ball being pushed. After each goal, the non-scoring team restarts the game, with a face off on the centre line.

A goal is scored when the ball is hit or pushed from within the opponents' defensive zone, and then passes into or through the opponents' goal. If the ball goes over the side line, the opposing team shall have a free push at the point where the ball crossed the line.  If the ball goes over the back line, the opposing team shall have a free push on the 10 metre line opposite the point where the ball went over the back line. 

A free hit (a free push for under-7 games) is awarded to the opposing team for any player:
 raising the stick above waist height;
 playing the ball deliberately with their feet or hands
 playing the ball deliberately with the rounded side of the stick
 raising the ball above knee height
 obstructing an opponent i.e. placing their body between the ball and the opponent
 criticising or ridiculing another player or the umpire
 hitting another player or the umpire, or another player's stick with their own
 making up a third player playing the ball

All players must be 5 metres away when a free hit is taken.  Accidental infringements in defensive zones result in a free hit to the opposing team on the 10 metre line, in line with the point where the infringement took place

Safety
In the interests of safety  players are strongly encouraged to wear a mouth guard and  shin guards for both training and playing. At no time should a player, coach or any other person at Mini hockey swing a stick so that it is raised above waist height. No more than six players (for under-7s) or seven players (for under-9s) be allowed on the field at any one time. But some players do choose to wear goggles as to not have their eyes gouged by an opposing players stick.

References

Variations of field hockey
Children's sport